The 2015 Sokoto State gubernatorial election was the 8th gubernatorial election of Sokoto State. Held on April 11, 2015, the All Progressives Congress nominee Aminu Tambuwal won the election, defeating Abdallah Wali of the People's Democratic Party.

APC primary
APC candidate, Aminu Tambuwal clinched the party ticket. The APC primary election was held in 2014.

PDP primary
PDP candidate, Abdallah Wali clinched the party ticket. The PDP primary election was held in 2014.

Results 
A total of 21 candidates contested in the election. Aminu Tambuwal from the All Progressives Congress won the election, defeating Abdallah Wali from the People's Democratic Party. 32,054 votes was cancelled, valid votes was 926,682, votes cast was 958,736. The winner, Aminu Tambuwal won in all the 23 Local Government Areas in the State.

References 

Sokoto State gubernatorial elections
Sokoto gubernatorial
April 2015 events in Nigeria